Qi Dakai (born 23 May 1987) is a Chinese athlete specialising in the hammer throw. He won a bronze medal at the 2013 Asian Championships.

His personal best in the event is 74.19 metres set in Pune in 2013.

International competitions

References

1987 births
Living people
Chinese male hammer throwers
Athletes (track and field) at the 2018 Asian Games
Asian Games competitors for China
21st-century Chinese people